The Nissan Trade is a light commercial vehicle that was produced by Nissan Motor Ibérica from 1987 to 2001 in Spain and was marketed only in Europe. It was a replacement for the Ebro F108, itself a rebadged Alfa Romeo Romeo van, that was marketed exclusively in Spain, competing primarily against the Effedi Gasolone and the Hyundai Libero.

Production 
It was available in both van and chassis cab forms, although the van variants were mostly available to Spain, with the chassis cabs being exported. It was based on the same chassis as the Ebro F108 vehicle, although it had different drivetrain and engine options. 

Heavy-duty versions had a rear-wheel-drive configuration, while lighter versions were front-wheel drive. These vehicles were powered by Perkins engines. There was also a Trade Van version, which had an even simpler equipment and had swing-leaf side doors, instead of sliding doors.

Due to its outdated design and equipment (it did not have airbags and ABS in the 1990s), the Trade was not popular in some European countries. It did not offer contemporary comfort or a large number of standard features. Power steering was available as an option.

From 1993, a version with a 2.8-liter 86 hp turbodiesel was optional. During that time Nissan made a joint venture with Renault to produce the Renault Master, under the name Nissan Interstar, as a replacement for the Nissan Trade, but due to its popularity in some markets, the Trade models were produced until 2001.

It was also assembled in Avia Vehicles factories, a firm that was responsible for the design of the van.

References 

Trade
Vans
Pickup trucks
Cab over vehicles
Vehicles introduced in 1987
Rear-wheel-drive vehicles